is a Japanese national highway connecting the capital cities Kagoshima and Naha of Kagoshima Prefecture and Okinawa Prefecture, respectively. The highway begins at an intersection with National Routes 3 and 10 in Kagoshima. From Kagoshima, it travels southwest along the first island chain that divides the Pacific Ocean from the East China Sea. From the north to the south, it has sections on the islands of Tanegashima, Amami Ōshima, and finally, Okinawa. On Okinawa it ends at an intersection with National Routes 330, 331, and 390 in Naha.

Route description

This very unusual road has continuous numbering over disconnected segments on the islands of Kyūshū, Tanegashima, Amami Ōshima, and Okinawa. It originates in the prefectural capital of Kagoshima in Kagoshima Prefecture and terminates in Naha, the capital of Okinawa Prefecture.

Kagoshima Prefecture
At its northern terminus, National Route 58 meets National Routes 3, 10, 224, 225, and 226. At the port, National Route 224 leaves National Route 58, continuing by ferry to the city of Tarumizu beyond the stratovolcano, Sakurajima.

Heading south by ferry, the highway resumes its land route in Nishinoomote on the northern end of Tanegashima. It travels alongside the western coast of the island within Nishinoomote. Upon crossing into the town, Nakatane, the highway ventures inland, heading towards the central district of the town. Continuing south the highway crosses into the town, Minamitane on the southern end of Tanegashima. After traveling through the center of Minamitane, the highway turns northwest and heads towards the west coast of the island where the maritime section of the highway resumes at the Port of Shimama. Unlike the previous maritime section, no ferry carries the highway from Shimama to its next land segment on Amami Ōshima.

Resuming its land route in the Amami Ōshima city of Amami, the highway travels southeast across the island from its northeastern tip. The highway crosses through the town of Tatsugo and then returns into the city of Amami. After passing through the central part of the city, the highway curves to the south, traveling towards the island's eastern coast. It then curves to the west, heading towards the south-central part of the island. It curves to the south once and crosses into Setouchi. Upon reaching the island's southern coast, the highway curves to the southwest, heading towards the Setouchi's central district on the southwestern end of Amami Ōshima. In the center of the town the highway's land section ends once again. Like the previous maritime section, there is no ferry between Amami Ōshima and the highway's land section on Okinawa.

Okinawa Prefecture
The highway's final land segment starts near the Port of Oku in Kunigami at the northern tip of Okinawa Island. It travels around the edges of Cape Hedo from the point's eastern side to the west coast of the cape and then curves to the southwest running along the western coast of the island to the highway's southern terminus in Naha. Further to the south along the coast, the highway crosses into the village of Ōgimi. In the village the highway meets National Route 331 on the northern shore of Shioya Bay. As the highway leaves the village and crosses in the city of Nago, it curves to the west. It then meets National Route 505, and proceeds to the south, leaving the coast and crossing the bottom of the Motobu Peninsula.

As the highway approaches central Nago, it has an intersection with the Nago-higashi Bypass, an alternate route of National Route 58. Upon reaching central Nago, the highway meets the Nago Bypass, an alternate route of National Route 449. Curving to the south, the highway meets the mainline of National Route 449. Here the highway meets the western coast of Okinawa once more and continues traveling alongside it away from central Nago. Near the southern limits of the city the highway meets the northern end of the Okinawa Expressway, a tolled, limited-access highway that parallels National Route 58 to the east from Nago to Naha. The national highway continues south along the coast passing through the rural villages of Onna and Yomitan.

In the town of Kadena, the highway curves its way around the northwestern and western edges of the United States Air Force's Kadena Air Base. Proceeding south, the highway then goes through the town of Chatan and its American Village, a shopping and entertainment district that boast American themes. The town is also home to the United States Marine Corps Camp Lester. The highway curves to the southwest after leaving Chatan and entering the city of Ginowan, home to the Marine Corps Air Station Futenma. The highway travels along the northern edge of the installation, here an auxiliary route of National Route 58, the Ginowan Bypass, travels further to the north along the coast. The two highways meet after they cross into the city of Urasoe. Another US military installation, Camp Kinser, is located to the west of the National Route 58 in Urasoe while the central district of the city lies to the east of the route.

Crossing into Naha, the last stretch of the highway is six lanes wide in the city. The highway is flanked by shops and sites that display the influence the American occupation had on the city. The highway ends at a junction just north of Meiji Bridge with National Routes 330, 331, and 390.

History

The precursor to what would eventually become National Route 58 on Okinawa was originally established in the 15th century during the reign of Shō Kinpuku, ruler of the Ryukyu Kingdom. Shō Kinpuku ordered the construction of a road, called the  that traveled all of the way around Okinawa. National Route 58 is mostly situated along the western route of the Yanbaru-kokudō. The Yanbaru-kokudō was designated as an Okinawa Prefecture Road in 1915 between the cities of Nago and Naha.

The direct predecessors to National Route 58 in Okinawa are Military Road 1, which was established during the Battle of Okinawa and maintained by United States Civil Administration of the Ryukyu Islands, and Government Highway 1, which was maintained by the Government of the Ryukyu Islands until the islands were returned to Japan. The highway functioned as the island's main road during World War II and the subsequent US administration of the region. Military Road 1 was captured during the early stages of the Battle of Okinawa and it was quickly redeveloped by Japanese prisoners of war to facilitate the US effort to capture the island—and occupy it. The highway was mainly developed as a high-speed logistics route for the US military that could carry vehicles weighing up to 35 tons. It was re-designated as Government Highway 1 during the civil administration of the island, but the US military's vehicles still took priority over the local Okinawan driving community, who were not allowed to pass US military convoys and vehicles. After the return of the Ryukyu Islands from the United States to Japan on 15 May 1972, the aforementioned highways were all re-designated as a part of National Route 58. It remains the only Japanese national highway to be given a two-digit number following the reclassification of the Primary and Secondary National Highways as the General National Highways in 1965. Until 30 July 1978, traffic on National Route 58 in Okinawa Prefecture drove on the right rather than the left. After the 730 switch, Okinawa joined the rest of Japan in driving on the left in accordance to the Vienna Convention on Road Traffic.

Major intersections
The list below does not account for distances on the highway's maritime sections.

See also
1996 Padilla car crash

References

External links

058
Roads in Kagoshima Prefecture
Roads in Okinawa Prefecture
1972 establishments in Japan